is a Japanese voice actress from Aichi Prefecture.

Filmography

Anime
We Were There as Yuri Yamamoto
Canvas 2 ~Niji Iro no Sketch~ as Female student (ep 5)
Galaxy Angel Rune as Lily C Sherbet
Hametsu No Mars as Tomomi Nakahara
Jubei-Chan 2: The Counter Attack of Siberia Yagyu as Freesia Yagyu
Lucky Star as Miyuki Takara (drama CD & video game)
True Tears as Honoka Uehara

External links

Year of birth missing (living people)
Living people
Japanese video game actresses
Japanese voice actresses
Voice actresses from Aichi Prefecture